The 1820 Settlers National Monument, which honours the contribution to South African society made by the British 1820 Settlers, overlooks Makhanda in the Eastern Cape. It commemorates the Anglo-Africans, as well as the English language, as much as the settlers themselves. The building was designed by John Sturrock, Sturrock was inspired by the work of Louis Kahn.

National Arts Festival 
The Monument is closely linked with the National Arts Festival, often known simply as the Grahamstown Festival.  Ever since the monument's opening on 13 July 1974, the festival has been held there every year, except for in 1975.  Virtually all possible venues in Grahamstown are used during the festival, but the Monument is the anchor of the event and the biggest venue too.  The main theatre in the monument complex is named after Guy Butler.

Fire in 1994 

The monument was devastated by a fire in 1994 and rebuilt and was officially re-dedicated by Nelson Mandela in May 1996.

See also 

 Rhodes University
 National Arts Festival

Notes

References

External links 

 
 

Cultural infrastructure completed in 1974
Monuments and memorials in South Africa
Buildings and structures in Makhanda, Eastern Cape
British-South African culture